Peter Bertran (born 5 March 1996) is a Dominican Republic tennis player.

Bertran has a career high ATP singles ranking of 540 achieved on 1 August 2022. He also has a career high ATP doubles ranking of 517 achieved on 26 September 2022.

Bertran represents the Dominican Republic at the Davis Cup, where he has a W/L record of 1–1.

Bertran played college tennis at the University of South Florida from 2015-2018 after playing his freshman year at the University of Georgia.

Junior career 
As a junior, Bertran achieved a career high ranking of No. 97 in the world junior rankings by the International Tennis Federation.

In 2014, he reached the main draw of the 2014 French Open Junior Championships before losing to Karen Kachanov in the 1st round and reached the 2nd round of the qualifying draw in the Wimbledon Junior Championships.

Challenger and World Tennis Tour Finals

Singles: 3 (3-0)

References

External links

1996 births
Living people
Dominican Republic male tennis players
Sportspeople from Santo Domingo
South Florida Bulls athletes
Georgia Bulldogs tennis players